Reserva Natural Punta Cucharas (Punta Cucharas Nature Reserve) is a nature reserve in Barrio Canas, Ponce, Puerto Rico. It consists of both a land area component as well as an offshore marine area. The Reserve consists of mangrove ecosystems, coastal sand dunes, a saline lagoon known as Laguna Las Salinas, open water, and a century-old local community. The lagoon occupies and area of  Ecological protection is managed and enforced by the Puerto Rico Department of Natural and Environmental Resources. Eight activities are allowed at the Reserve: scuba diving, boating, fishing, hiking, sun bathing, photography, bird watching and canoeing. Activities prohibited are: Camping, crabbing/trapping, horseback riding, water crafting, and hunting. Pets, ATVs, and fireplaces are also prohibited.

History

In 2001, the Puerto Rico Ornithology Society started promoting the conservation of the Las Cucharas area and proposed it as an Important Area for the Conservation of Birds. Then, during 2003–2004, the United States Geological Survey, with the support of the Ponce Municipal Government, conducted a hydrology study of Laguna Las Salinas. In June 2004, the Integrated Planning Area of the Natural Patrimony Division of the Department of Natural and Environmental Resources of Puerto Rico (DRNA) issued a report on the natural value of the Punta Cucharas area. In 2008, Amigos de La Laguna (Friends of the Lagoon), a local concerned citizens group, issued a press release showing the impact that construction of the Gasoducto del Norte was to have on the lagoon. In August 2008, the Legislature of Puerto Rico passed Law 227 designating the Punta Cucharas natural area as a nature reserve and creating the Punta Cucharas Nature Reserve using, among others, the June 2004 DRNA report. On 9 August 2008, Punta Cucharas became a protected area under the law.

Location and size
The area is located in the coastal and the subcoastal zones of the southern end of Barrio Canas. The area is bounded in the west by a tourist development, including a hotel, in the north by modern residential compounds, and in the south by the Caribbean Sea. It includes all the land southeast of Road PR-2 in Barrio Canas and the marine component of Isla de Ratones and Isla Cardona. The Caribbean Sea Marine Extent component includes the waters south of points from Punta Cucharas in the west and Rio Matilde in the east, both in the Ponce mainland, and north of points from Isla de Ratones in the west and Isla Cardona in the east, both islands south of Ponce. Isla de Ratones and Isla Cardona are both included in the Punta Cucharas Nature Reserve.

It consists of a salt water lagoon known as Laguna Salinas (Salinas Lagoon) that measures 347,898 square meters, as well as forestland systems of mangroves and other coastal forests, and different types of estuary and marshy wetlands. It also includes extensive areas of sand dunes covered by herbaceous vegetation, part of which are gramineous plants. The Reserve's total area is 698 cuerdas. The Salinas Lagoon has a mangrove that expands about 37 acres.

Ecological value
The Municipality of Ponce recognized the ecological value of the Punta Cucharas natural area and included a Special Plan PL. E. 2, on La Matilde Area (the Area that includes the Punta Cuchara area) in its Territorial Plan (Integral Review effective on 23 December 2003), in its Ordination Regulations component. This Special Plan intended to facilitate a residential, tourist and commercial development, contingent on the protection of natural resources such as Laguna Salinas and the wetlands to the south of the area and the conversion of PR-2 to an expressway and the construction of parallel service roads. Among the objectives of the Municipality of Ponce development were the establishment of a protection zone for wetlands and the Laguna Salinas.

The Action Program of the Territorial Ordinance Plan (1993) Judicial Ruling known as Ruling JAC 93–0485 in "Municipality of Ponce vs. Government of Puerto Rico", a.k.a., Ponce en Marcha was a $615,000 yet-to-be-built project in the Hacienda La Matilde area programmed to be finished during the 1996-97 of the Government of Puerto Rico fiscal year. However, "recognizing the great ecological value of the Punta Cucharas ecosystem, the Territorial Ordinance Plan of the Municipality of Ponce sought to protect the Punta Cucharas area, identifying it as a "high interest" ecotourism area.

Shoreline geology and habitats
The shoreline habitat consists of exposed mangroves, mixed sand and gravel beaches, and fine grained sandy beaches. The Reserve wildlife consists of wading birds and shore birds.

Flora and fauna
The Reserve has 148 flora species, 56 bird species (including both resident or migratory species), five mammal species, nine reptile species, five amphibians, and six fish species.

Flora
Critically endangered plant species include Cordia rupicola and Leptocereus quadricostatus (sebucan); Endangered is Guaiacum officinale (guaiac tree) and vulnerable is the Maytenus ponceana. Some of the 147 plant species found at the Punta Cucharas Reserve are listed below.

Fauna

Birds
Fifty-six bird species have been identified in the Reserve. Five of them are endemic species. A partial catalog of the bird species found in the Reserve includes Charrancito (Sternula antillarum), a key IBA water foul species that breeds in the area. Endemic species are: Zumbador Verde (Anthracothorax viridis), (Chlorostilbon maugaeus), San Pedrito (Todus mexicanus), Carpintero (Melanerpes portoricensis), Juí (Myiarchus antillarum), Bienteveo (Vireo latimeri), Reinita Mariposera (Dendroica adelaidae), Comeñame (Loxigilla portoricensis), and Reina Mora (Spindalis portoricensis). Mariquita ("Agelaius xanthomus") flies into the area but does not reside there. Other bird species are: Zumbador Dorado (Anthracothorax dominicus), Zumbador Pechiazul (Eulampis holosericeus), Zorzal Pardo (Margarops fuscatus) and Jilguero (Euphonia musica).

There are 56 species identified of which six are endemic, 44 are resident, five are migratory and one is introduced. The following table lists a sampling of them.

Mammals
The following five species of mammals were found in Punta Cuchara.

Reptiles
Punta Cucharas biodiversity includes reptiles such as Hemidactylus brookii, Sphaerodactylus macrolepis, Sphaerodactylus roosevelti, Anolis cristatellus, Anolis pulchellus, Ameiva exsul,and Anolis poncensis, and the amphibians Bufo marinus, Eleutherodactylus coqui and Leptodactylus albilabris. Of the reptile species, the lagartijo jardinero del sur (Anolis poncensis) is protected under the "vulnerable" classification by Rule 6766 of the "Regulations to Govern  Vulnerable and Endangered Species in the Commonwealth of Puerto Rico" pursuant to Puerto Rico Law 241, commonly known as "The Puerto Rico Wildlife Law."  Following is a listing of reptiles found at the Reserve.

Amphibians

Environmental challenges

Clean up
The June 2004 DRNA study warned that due to the lack of surveillance and the easy access that several roads provide to the area, it had become a common practice to use the area as a clandestine junk yard for motor vehicles and other refuse. The report suggested strategies for the management, cleaning, reforestation and conservation of the area. Several groups, including civic, environmental, and church groups, interested in the conservation of the Salinas Lagoon as part of the Punta Cucharas natural area have participated in cleaning campaigns for the removal of junk with the collaboration of the Municipality of Ponce. The DRNA also took steps to reforest the area. In 2013, some vandals used the area for dumping construction refuse, a practice that carries a fine of $5,000.

Legal efforts
As an additional vehicle to preserve the area, the government of Puerto Rico included Punta Cucharas as a natural reserve under the Natural Patrimony Program created by Act No. 150 of August 4, 1988, known as the "Puerto Rico Natural Patrimony Program Act."

Facilities improvements
In October 2012, the Puerto Rico Department of Natural and Environmental Resources published a 54-page environmental impact evaluation with numerous appendixes. In it, the DRNA proposed relocating the existing main vehicular entrance and building the necessary entryway and signing, making improvements to the existing road, building gazebos for group picnics and relaxation plus a gazebo for nature talks, construction a floating dock for kayaks, creation of an additional dock for ondock-fishing, erecting an observation tower and building a restaurant, a boat ramp, and bathroom facilities (compost toilets). The development area would cover . As a low environmental impact construction project, the plans include no new water, sewer, or electrical lines being brought into the area. The cost was estimated at $1.2 million.

Gallery of flora and fauna

Flora at Punta Cucharas

Fauna at Punta Cucharas

Birds

Non-birds

Mammals

Reptiles

Amphibians

See also

 Porta Caribe
 Cerrillos State Forest
 Toro Negro State Forest

Notes

References

Further reading
 Dávila, D. and Sustache, J. (2004) Informe sobre el valor natural del Área Natural Punta Cucharas, Barrio Canas, Ponce. Informe, Áreas de Planificación Integral, División de Patrimonio Natural, Departamento de Recursos Naturales y Ambientales, Puerto Rico: Estado Libre Asociado de Puerto Rico.
 Hernández-Delgado, E. A. (2010) Baseline biological characterization of coral reefs at Punta Cucharas Natural Reserve, Ponce, Puerto Rico.
 Méndez-Gallardo and Salguero-Faría (2008) Puerto Rico chapter. In: Important Bird Areas in the Caribbean: key sites for conservation. Cambridge, UK: BirdLife International. (BirdLife Conservation Series No. 15).
 Vásquez Cruz, R., Carrero Morales, C. J., Ramos García, J., Valdés, A. K., Maldonado Arroyo, A. and Pons Cintrón, G. (2011) Informe final del proyecto de monitoreo socio-económico en las Áreas Protegidas Marinas y costeras de Puerto Rico. Reserva Natural Punta Cucharas, Ponce, Puerto Rico. Centro Interdisciplinario de Estudios del Litoral, Universidad de Puerto Rico en Mayagüez. Departamento de Recursos Naturales y Ambientales de Puerto Rico.
 Puerto Rico Statewide Assessment and Strategies for Forest Resources. Government of Puerto Rico. Department of Natural and Environmental Resources. (n.d.; ca. 2011) 171 pages. 
 Puerto Rico Statewide Assessment and Strategies for Forest Resources. Government of Puerto Rico. Department of Natural and Environmental Resources. (n.d.; ca. 2011) 100 pages.
 Guide to the Ecological Systems of Puerto Rico. Gary L. Miller and Ariel E. Lugo. United States Department of Agriculture Forest Service. International Institute of Tropical Forestry. General Technical Report IITF-GTR-35. June 2009.
 Hydrologic, water-quality, and biological assessment of Laguna de Las Salinas, Ponce, Puerto Rico, January 2003-September 2004. Luis R Soler-López, Fernando Gómez-Gómez, and Jesús Rodríguez-Martínez. Office of the Mayor of the Municipality of Ponce, PR, and  U.S. Geological Survey. Reston, Va. : U.S. Geological Survey. 2005.

External links
 Información básica sobre Reserva Natural Punta Cucharas. Reverdece Tu Comunidad. 1 page. Universidad de Puerto Rico en Ponce. 15 July 2016. Accessed 123 February 2019.
 Hojas de Nuestro Ambiente. Gobierno de Puerto Rico. Departamento de Recursos Naturales y Ambientales (DRNA). Los Reptiles de Puerto Rico. Publication P-025. February 2008. (In Spanish)

Tourist attractions in Ponce, Puerto Rico
Puerto Rico state forests
Geography of Ponce, Puerto Rico
2008 establishments in Puerto Rico
National Forests of Puerto Rico
Environment of Puerto Rico